The Nobelhuis is a house located in the Nobelstraat in The Hague, the Netherlands.  It is believed to be the oldest residential house in The Hague.

References

Buildings and structures in The Hague
Houses in the Netherlands